Star map is another name for a star chart, a map of the night sky.

Star map(s) or starmap(s) may also refer to:

 Star Maps (film), a 1997 American drama
 Star Maps (album), a 1996 album by Possum Dixon
 "Star Maps", a song by Spoons from Static in Transmission, 2011
 "Star Maps", a song by Aly & AJ from Sanctuary, 2019
 Star Map (Star Wars), an object in the video game Star Wars: Knights of the Old Republic
 Star Maps, a mobile app started by Josh Flagg
 Starmaps, the ninth issue of Marvel's Swords of the Swashbucklers

See also
 Starmap Mobile Alliance, a 2004 agreement among some European cell phone providers
 Maps to the Stars, 2014 film
 Star chart (disambiguation)